Tre Martelli are an Italian folk and traditional music band.  Since 1977, Tre Martelli has been developing its work on the study, recovery and popularization of the traditional musical culture of the region of Piemonte in northern Italy.

The quality and accuracy of its field work, and the attention given to stylistic variations in the area, together with energy and creative maturity of the band's performances, have engendered enthusiastic audience response and critical acclaim, both at home and abroad. This has resulted in a huge increase in concerts and tours, not only in Italy but also in the most part of Europe. The band's recorded output has been unanimously acclaimed by specialist international critics writing in the world's foremost music publications.
The group had numerous appearances in some European national TV-channels such as RAI, B.B.C. and others.

Discography
1978 Danza di luglio - demotape
1982 Trata Birata - Trata Birata, CL001			
1985 Giacu Trus -	Pentagramma, LPPG 218		
1987 La Tempesta - Trata Birata, TM 003			
1991 Brüze Carvè - Trata Birata, TM 005			
1995 Omi e Paiz  -  Robi Droli, rdc 5024		
2000 Car der Steili - Felmay, 8023				
2002 Semper Viv (antologia) - Felmay, 8048                  		
2005 Tra Cel e Tèra - Felmay, 8097
2012 Cantè 'r paròli - omaggio a Giovanni Rapetti - Felmay, 8193
2014 Tre Martelli & Gianni Coscia Ansema - Felmay, 8219
 2017 40 gir 1977-2017 - Felmay, 8247
 2021 Concerto di Natale - Felmay, 8279

Anthology
1989 Folkautore - Madau dischi     	
1995 Roots Music Atlas - Robi Droli		
1996 Gente del Piemonte - De Agostini		
1997 Roots Music Atlas – Italia 2 - Robi Droli		
1997 Musica popolare in Piemonte (1957-1997) - Regione Piemonte
1998 Tradizione popolare e linguaggio colto nell'Ottocento e Novecento piemontese - Ass. Cult. Trata Birata       	
2001 Isolafolk-Decennale - Isolafolk
2002 Feestival Gooik  1996-2001	- DKdisc
2002 Capodanno celtico "Samonios" in musica -  Divo 00006			
2002 Omaggio al Piemonte vol.2 - Regione Piemonte
2002 Tribù Italiche "Piemonte" - WorldMusic 028		
2003 Italie:instruments de la musique populaire - Buda Records
2003 Tradicionarius 2003   XVI ediciò  Discmedi - Barcelona       	
2004 Piemonte. Antologia della musica antica e moderna - Dejavu Retro		
2004 Italia 3 – Atlante di musica tradizionale -  Dunya records		
2005 Piemonte World - The stars look very different today - Regione Piemonte	
2005 Gong – Tradizioni in movimento - Gong

Bibliography
1987 - Livio Tesio La riproposta della canzone tradizionale in Piemonte
1990 - Giovanni Sisto Alessandria una provincia diversa
1995 - Franco Castelli La danza contro il tiranno
1996 - AAVV The rough guide to world music
1997 - Franco Lucà & Maurizio Martinotti Musica popolare in Piemonte
1998 - Michele L. Straniero Antologia della canzone popolare piemontese tra settecento e novecento
2002 - Ivo Franchi e Ezio Guaitamacchi 100 dischi ideali per capire la world music
2003 - Luca Ferrari Folk geneticamente modificato
2003 - Ugo Boccassi & Franco Rangone (IO) lui, gli altri e la musica
2005 - AAVV 80 anni di storia alessandrina2014 - AAVV (a cura di Noretta Nori) Viaggio nella danza popolare in Italia2014 - Stefano Baldi Le fonti musicali in Piemonte, IV volume, Regione Piemonte
2020 - Maurizio Berselli Storie folk, il folk revival nell'Italia settentrionale e centrale raccontato dai protagonisti,'' Artestampa, 2020

External links
Official website

Italian folk music groups
Piedmont